Benchamatheputhit School' (BMP) (Thai:โรงเรียนเบญจมเทพอุทิศ)  is a high school in Phetchaburi Province, Thailand. It is a large secondary school that receives co-education students and open from grade 7 to grade 12.

 History 
In 1910, people in Phetchaburi donated 2,700 baht to build a statue of King Rama V to commemorate the palace Ram Palace (Wang Ban Puen Palace), but was not used. King Rama V died on October 23, 1910. Phyathai Srisawat was governor of Phetchaburi at that time. He asked to use the donation to build a provincial women's school. Named Benchamatheputhit School, the first teaching session was held on 1 August 1917.

 Study Program 

 For Secondary (Grade 7-9) 
-         Science – Mathematics Program

-         English Program(EP)

-         Normal Program

-         Math Science Bilingual Program(HUB)

 For Upper Secondary (Grade 10-12) 
-         Science Program

-         Science – Mathematics Program

-         English - France Program

-         English – Mathematics Program

-         English – Chinese Program

 Classroom Styles 
- Scientific Laboratory

- Green room

- Mathematic Smart Classroom

- Computer Lab

- English Corner

- AFS

 Schools Affiliated with Benchamatheputhit school 
- Benjamarachutit Ratchaburi

- Benchamaracharungsarit

- Benchama Maharat

- Benjamarachutit

- Benchamabophit

- Benchamarachuthit

- Benjamarachutit Pattani

- Benjamarachanusorn

 References 
1.เบญจม.Benchama it.bmp Retrieved November 16, 2017.

2.เบญจม.โรงเรียนเบญจมเทพอุทิศจังหวัดเพชรบุรี.Wikipedia''. Retrieved November 16, 2017.

Schools in Thailand
Buildings and structures in Phetchaburi province